Ravinuthala  is an agricultural village in Prakasam District in the state of Andhra Pradesh, India.  It has around 2,000 houses with more than 7,280 people (3,630 male and 3,650 female). And it is the major Panchyath in its Mandal Korisapadu.
The Raghupati Venkata Ratnam Naidu Zilla Parishat Unnata Paatasaala was opened before the independence. The land was donated by local Kapu for the benefit of the village. The high school is reason behind the upward movement of this village.  It has a cricket stadium wherein state-level matches held. Often celebrities attend to the matches.
Famous Telugu artist Giribabu hails from the village only.

References

External links 
 RVN Information

Villages in Prakasam district